In the United States Armed Forces, the ranks of warrant officer (grades W‑1 to W‑5; see NATO: WO1–WO5) are rated as officers above all non-commissioned officers, candidates, cadets, and midshipmen, but subordinate to the lowest officer grade of O‑1 (NATO: OF‑1). This application differs from the Commonwealth of Nations and other militaries, where warrant officers are the most senior of the other ranks (NATO: OR‑8 and OR‑9), equivalent to the U.S. Armed Forces grades of E‑8 and E‑9.

Warrant officers are highly skilled, single-track specialty officers. While the ranks are authorized by Congress, each branch of the uniformed services selects, manages, and uses warrant officers in slightly different ways. For appointment to the rank of warrant officer one (W‑1), normally a warrant is approved by the secretary of the respective service. However, appointment to this rank can come via commission by the service secretary, the department secretary, or by the president, but this is less common. For the chief warrant officer ranks (CW‑2 to CW‑5), these warrant officers are commissioned by the president. Both warrant officers and chief warrant officers take the same oath as other commissioned officers (O‑1 to O‑10).

Warrant officers can and do command detachments, units, vessels, aircraft, and armored vehicles, as well as lead, coach, train, and counsel subordinates. However, the warrant officer's primary task as a leader is to serve as a technical expert, providing valuable skills, guidance, and expertise to commanders and organizations in their particular field.

Rank insignia

Army

History 

The Army warrant officer traces lineage to 1896 with the War Department's creation of civilian headquarters clerks and pay clerks. In 1916, an Army Judge Advocate General review determined that field clerks should be members of the military. Legislation in 1916 authorized those positions as military rather than civilian and created the ranks of Army field clerk (the former rank of headquarters clerk) and Quarter Master Corps field clerk (the former rank of pay clerk). In July, 1917, all Field Clerks were considered enlisted and were assigned an enlisted uniform. Their branch insignia was two crossed quill pens (worn on a disk pin on the left side of the standing collar and a freework insignia on the visored cap).

On 19 December 1917, Special Regulation 41 stated that the Army Field Clerk and Quarter Master Corps Field Clerk ranks were authorized the same uniform as an officer. Their rank insignia was now a freework pin of crossed quill pens on either side of the freework "U.S." pins worn on the standing collar of the M1909 tunic. They were not permitted the brown mohair cuff braid band of an Army officer, but were authorized a silver-and-black braid hatcord for wear with the M1911 Campaign Hat and the officer's "G.I. Eagle" on the M1902 peaked cap.

On 9 July 1918, Congress established the rank and grade of warrant officer concurrent with establishing the Army Mine Planter Service (AMPS) within the Coast Artillery Corps. Creation of the Mine Planter Service replaced an informal service crewed by civilians, replacing them with military personnel, of whom the vessel's master, mates, chief engineer, and assistant engineers were Army warrant officers. Warrant officer rank was indicated by rings of brown cord worn on the lower sleeve of the uniform jacket: two for 2nd Mate and 2nd Assistant Engineer, three for 1st Mate and Assistant Engineer, and four for Ship's Master and Chief Engineer.

Since that time, the position of warrant officer in the Army has been refined. On 21 August 1941, under , Congress authorized two grades: warrant officer (junior grade) and chief warrant officer. In 1942, temporary appointments in about 40 occupational areas were made.
The brown enamel backing of the warrant officer insignia was based on the color of the sleeve insignia of rank for ship's officers of the AMPS.

On 18 July 1942 , the Flight Officer Act, was enacted, creating the rank of flight officer, equivalent to warrant officer (junior grade) and assigned to the U.S. Army Air Forces (USAAF). Insignia was the same as for a warrant officer (junior grade), except the backing was in blue enamel rather than brown. Most flight officers were graduates of various USAAF flight-training programs, including power and glider pilots, and navigator and bombardier ratings. Graduates were appointed to the rating of flight officer, but some of each graduating class were commissioned as second lieutenants. Once reaching operational units and after gaining flying experience, flight officers were later offered direct commissions as lieutenants.

Flight sergeants, who were assigned as transport and glider pilots, were appointed as flight officers when the new rank was created. Some of the first eligible flight officers were Americans who had served as sergeant pilots in the Royal Air Force and who transferred to the USAAF after the U.S. entered the war.

In November 1942, the War Department defined the rank order as having warrant officers above all enlisted grades and below all commissioned grades. In March 1944, the first six women were appointed to the warrant officer grades as Band Leaders and administrative specialists.

In 1947, legislation was sought to introduce four grades of warrant officers. Proposed rank titles were: chief warrant officer, senior warrant officer, warrant officer first class, and warrant officer.

In 1949, the Career Compensation Act, created four pay grades, W-1 through W-4, for all the armed services. The two warrant ranks were unchanged, but warrant officer (junior grade) was pay grade W-1, while chief warrant officer started at W-2 and could advance to W-3 and -4.

In late 1949, the Warrant Officer Flight Program was created, which trained thousands of warrant officer pilots. The personnel were to be trained by the US Air Force, but controlled by the US Army Transportation Corps. The first helicopter pilot class was 51A (April 1951 to December 1951), which was trained to fly H-19 Chickasaws. The program was temporarily cancelled in 1959 due to military budget cuts, but was reinstated in 1963 to meet the increased demand.

In 1954, the Warrant Officer Act, created separate ranks for each pay grade, W-1 through W-4. On 10 September 1956, AR 670-5 authorized the approved insignia for the new ranks that consisted of a metal frame around a brown enamel bar. The insignia for warrant officer 1 (Grade W-1) and chief warrant officer 2 (Grade W-2) was a gold metal frame with one or two horizontal metal bands across it. Chief warrant officer 3 and chief warrant officer 4 had a silver frame with one or two horizontal bands across it.

Due to the demand for helicopter pilots in Vietnam, the number of warrant officer pilots grew from about 2,960 in 1966 to more than 12,000 by 1970. In 1973, a reduction in force began and chief warrant officer helicopter pilots were offered promotion to the rank of first lieutenant to retain combat veterans.

On 10 June 1970, the Army adopted a redesigned warrant officer insignia that was easier to identify. It was a silver bar with one to four black enamel squares on it (one per level of rank). "In July 1972, Army Warrant Officers began wearing the newly designed silver rank insignia, with black squares..." (Although wear of the new grade of rank insignia was not mandatory until August, 1973.)

Beginning in 1977 the Army began commissioning "chief warrant officers" (CWOs) upon appointment/promotion to the grade of "chief warrant officer two" (W-2) and above. This brought Army CWOs in-line with those of the "Sea Services" (i.e., Marine Corps, Navy, and Coast Guard) whom had always been "commissioned warrant officers."

On 8 April 1988, the rank of master warrant officer (MW4) was created in the grade of W-4. Candidates were drawn from chief warrant officer 4s (CW4) who had attended a special course at the warrant officer school at Fort Rucker. The first class graduated on 8 December 1988. The Warrant Officer Management Act  of 5 December 1991, created the paygrade of W5 and the separate rank of master warrant officer (CW5), since renamed as chief warrant officer five.

On 9 July 2004 the warrant officer branch insignia (also known as the "Eagle Rising" or "Squashed Bug") was discontinued. The warrant officer's branch of assignment will now be worn instead.

Mission and use 
Army warrant officers are technical experts, combat leaders, trainers, and advisors. They serve in 17 branches and 67 warrant officer specialties, spanning the Active Component (i.e., Regular Army), the Army National Guard, and the U.S. Army Reserve. Warrant officers command the Army's waterborne and seagoing vessels, most Army bands, and as aircraft commanders of most Army Aviation aircraft. In addition, they may be found in command of various small units and detached teams.

The Army uses warrant officers to serve in specific positions which require greater longevity than the billet duration of commanders and other staff officers. The duration of these assignments results in increased technical expertise, as well as increased leadership and management skills.

Army warrant officers are officially addressed as Mister or Miss/Misses and warrant officers of grades CW2-CW5 can also be referred to as "Chief."

Training 
The body of warrant officers in the Army is composed of two communities: technicians and aviators. Technicians typically must be sergeants (E-5, 'NATO: OR-5) or above in a related specialty to qualify to become a warrant officer. A waiver may be granted on a case-by-case basis if the applicant has comparable experience in the government service or the civilian sector. The aviation field is open to all applicants, military or civilian, who meet the stringent medical and aptitude requirements. The aviation warrant officer route from the civilian sector is called the High School to Flight School Program, also known as "Street to Seat," where high school graduates or those actively serving that have a high school diploma are able to undergo Warrant Officer Candidate School (WOCS) and then proceed to aviation training at Fort Rucker, Alabama to commit ten years of military service as a U.S. Army aviator.

After selection to the warrant officer program, candidates attend WOCS, which is developed and administered by the Warrant Officer Career College (USAWOCC) at Fort Rucker. Army candidates on active duty must attend the course at Fort Rucker. Candidates in the United States National Guard attend the course either at Fort Rucker, or one of the National Guard's Regional Training Institutes. After graduation, all candidates are promoted to warrant officers (WO1). Technicians attend training at their respective branch's warrant officer basic course (WOBC), where they study advanced subjects in their technical area before moving on to their assignments in the Army. Aviation-branched warrant officers remain at Fort Rucker to complete flight training and the aviation WOBC.

Special Forces warrant officer candidates from both the active and national guard components attend the Special Forces Warrant Officer Technical and Tactical Certification Course (SFWOTTC) at the Special Forces Warrant Officer Institute, John F. Kennedy Special Warfare Center and School, Fort Bragg, North Carolina. The course includes both WOCS and WOBC, tailored to the unique training and experience of the Special Forces Sergeant. Candidates must be a staff sergeant (E-6, NATO: OR-6) and above, and have served three years on an operational detachment.

In 2008, the Army tested limited training of warrant officers at the United States Army Command and General Staff College at Fort Leavenworth, a course normally reserved exclusively for majors. The CGSC Class of 2009 included five warrant officers, and the Class of 2010 included nine warrant officers. Three 2010 graduates continued on to higher-level training at the School of Advanced Military Studies (SAMS) in 2011.

Ranks 

The Army warrant officer is a self-aware and adaptive technical expert, combat leader, trainer, and advisor. Through progressive levels of expertise in assignments, training, and education, the warrant officer administers, manages, maintains, operates, and integrates Army systems and equipment across the full spectrum of Army operations. Warrant officers are innovative integrators of emerging technologies, dynamic teachers, confident warfighters, and developers of specialized teams of soldiers. They support a wide range of Army missions throughout their careers. Warrant officers in the Army are accessed with specific levels of technical ability. They refine their technical expertise and develop their leadership and management skills through tiered progressive assignment and education. The following are specific characteristics and responsibilities of the separate, successive warrant officer grades:

A. Warrant officer one (WO1) / chief warrant officer two (CW2): A WO1 is an officer appointed by warrant with the requisite authority pursuant to assignment level and position given by the Secretary of the Army. CW2s and above are commissioned officers with the requisite authority pursuant to assignment level and position as given by the President of the United States. WO1's and CW2's primary focus is becoming proficient and working on those systems linked directly to their AOC/MOS, that is, their area of concentration (officer AOC), or an enlisted rank's military occupational specialty (MOS). Warrant officers are classified by warrant officer military occupational specialty, or WOMOS. As they become experts on the systems they operate and maintain, their focus migrates to integrating their systems with other branch systems.

B. Chief warrant officer three (CW3): The CW3s are advanced level technical and tactical experts who perform the primary duties of technical leader, trainer, operator, manager, maintainer, sustainer, integrator, and advisor. They also perform any other branch-related duties assigned to them. As they become more senior, their focus becomes integrating branch systems into larger Army systems. 
 
C. Chief warrant officer four (CW4): The CW4s are senior-level technical and tactical experts who perform the duties of technical leader, manager, maintainer, sustainer, integrator, and advisor and serve in a wide variety of branch level positions. As they become more senior, they focus on integrating branch and Army systems into joint and national-level systems. 
 
D. Chief warrant officer five (CW5): The CW5s are master-level technical and tactical experts who perform the primary duties of technical leader, manager, integrator, and advisor. They are the senior technical experts in their branches and serve at brigade and higher levels. They also serve as Command Chief Warrant Officers (CCWO) for large commands at the brigade level and higher.

Note: Chief warrant officer six was approved by the Army Chief of Staff in 1970 with the anticipation of Congress approving two new grades, W-5 and W-6. However, Congress did not authorize W-5 until 1991 and has still not approved W-6. The original W-5 insignia consisted of a single silver bar superimposed with four equally spaced silver squares with each square bordered in black. In 2004, this insignia was changed to a single silver bar surmounted by a single, narrow, vertical, black stripe, in harmony with the Navy and Marine Corps. The proposed CW6 insignia had two narrow, vertical, parallel, black stripes.

Marine Corps

History 
The Marine Corps has had warranted officers since 1916, when the Commandant of the Marine Corps made a request to the Secretary of the Navy for the creation of two warrant grades, marine gunner and quartermaster clerk. Those appointed would be selected from the noncommissioned officer ranks.

On 26 August 1916, Congress increased the Marine Corps strength, which included adding the rank of warrant officer; 43 marine gunners and 41 quartermaster clerks would be appointed. The first marine gunner is believed to have been Henry L. Hulbert. On 22 May 1917, due to commissioned officer shortages, all but three of the appointees were commissioned as temporary second lieutenants. In 1918, the grade of pay clerk was added.

In June, 1926, Congress created the commissioned warrant grades of chief marine gunner, chief quartermaster clerk, and chief pay clerk. Requirements for promotion to chief warrant officer were six years of service as a warrant officer and an examination to qualify.

During World War II, Congress abolished the titles of marine gunner, chief marine gunner, quartermaster clerk, chief quartermaster clerk, pay clerk, and chief pay clerk. Instead, they would be designated warrant officer or commissioned warrant officer. In 1943, all Marine warrant officer ranks were aligned with the other services. They were warrant officer and commissioned warrant officer.

Then in 1949, the grade of WO (paygrade W-1) was created for warrant officers and CWO-2, CWO-3, and CWO-4 (paygrades W-2, W-3, and W-4) were created for commissioned warrant officers. In 1954, title "chief warrant officer" replaced "commissioned warrant officer" for those in grades CWO-2, CWO-3 and CWO-4.

On 1 February 1992, the grade of CWO-5 (paygrade W-5) was created and those who are appointed serve on the highest unit echelon levels. Only 5% of chief warrant officers occupy this grade.

Current duties 

The present role and purpose of a chief warrant officer in the United States Marine Corps is to fulfill the responsibilities as a high-rank "subject matter expert" within their chosen military occupation specialty, with the additional authority of a commissioned officer.

The chief warrant officers commonly provide their respective Marine units and sections, valuable practical experience, and a master level of technical proficiency. Normally, an unrestricted officer (second lieutenant – general) would not have the opportunity to achieve such specialized skills due to their career progression track being more command-centric and less technical as they advance through the ranks.

Currently, there are three selection program distinctions, with each its own separate qualifications: infantry, recruiter and regular warrant officer. Both active-duty and reserve enlisted (non-commissioned officers) are accepted into the regular program, but infantry weapons officers—commonly known as Marine Gunners—and recruiters are only selected from the active-duty component.

The regular Warrant Officer Selection Program requires a minimum of eight years of enlistment upon date of appointment (not commissioned), proof and/or demonstration of their exceedingly technical proficiency within their MOS field, and achieved the rank and pay grade of sergeant (E-5) or above.

However, the duties of an infantry weapons officer are much more demanding. The Infantry Weapons Officer Program requires a minimum of sixteen years in MOS 0300 (Infantry) and achieved at least the rank and grade of gunnery sergeant (E-7). Given the extended time in service requirements and expertise, these gunners are commissioned as a chief warrant officer 2 directly from enlisted and wear the Bursting Bomb on their left collar.

Recruiter's selection is slightly different being they must be a minimum rank of staff sergeant (E-6) and hold the MOS 8412, career recruiter, as well as have served a successful recruiting tour as a 8412. Staff sergeants will appoint to the rank of WO, while the gunnery sergeants will commission as a CWO2. The time in service requirements remain the same of 8 years.

When the marines are selected for the program, they are given additional leadership and management training during the Warrant Officer Basic Course (WOBC), conducted at The Basic School, in Quantico, Virginia.

Navy 

In the United States Navy, the warrant and chief warrant officer ranks are held by technical specialists who direct specific activities essential to the proper operation of the ship, which also require commissioned officer authority. Navy warrant officers serve in 30 specialties covering five categories. Warrant officers should not be confused with the limited duty officer (LDO) in the Navy. Warrant officers perform duties that are directly related to their previous enlisted service and specialized training. This allows the Navy to capitalize on the experience of warrant officers without having to frequently transition them to other duty assignments for advancement. With the exception of the Navy's short-lived flying chief warrant officer program, all Navy warrant officers are accessed from the chief petty officer pay grades, E-7 through E-9, analogous to a senior noncommissioned officer in the other services, and must have a minimum 14 years time in service.

Background 

The Navy has had warrant officers among its ranks since 23 December 1775, when John Berriman received a warrant to act as purser aboard the brigantine, USS Andrew Doria. That warrant was considered a patent of trust and honor, but was not considered a commission to command. Since this first appointment, Navy warrant officers have held positions as masters, masters' mates, boatswains, gunners, carpenters, surgeons, and chaplains. Until 1912, a midshipman graduating from the United States Naval Academy was required to have two years of sea duty as a warrant officer before receiving a commission as an ensign. Although based on the British Royal Navy warrant officer ranks that were in place until 1949, the United States had never needed to address an issue of social class, which resulted in warranted officers in the Royal Navy. However, the United States Navy experienced a similar issue of rank, where highly competent senior noncommissioned officers are required to report to inexperienced junior officers, giving rise to special status to the Navy's chief warrant officers.

In 1995, the Navy ceased using the rank of warrant officer 1 (WO-1), also known as pay grade W-1. The Navy appoints their warrant officers directly to the rank of CWO2 (i.e., as chief warrant officers), and are "commissioned" officers, with the Navy Personnel Command/Bureau of Personnel (NAVPERSCOM/BUPERS) managing all grades (CWO2 through CWO5) by billets appropriate for each rank. In past years, some CWOs resigned their warrant commission prior to retirement to receive greater retirement pay at their former senior enlisted rank. However, this pay disparity has effectively disappeared in recent years and all Navy CWOs now retire at the appropriate officer grade.

Flying chief warrant officer 

The Navy started a Flying Chief Warrant Officer Program in 2006 to acquire additional naval aviators (pilots) and naval flight officers (NFOs), who would fly naval aircraft, but who would not compete with traditional unrestricted line (URL) officers in naval aviation for eventual command of squadrons, air wings, air stations, etc., the numbers of such commands which had been greatly reduced in the post-Cold War era, thereby limiting the command opportunity for URL pilots and NFOs.

Upon being commissioned as CWO2, selectees underwent warrant officer indoctrination and then flight school for 18 to 30 months. After completion of flight school, selectees were placed in one of four types of squadrons: ship-based Helicopter Maritime Strike (HSM) or Helicopter Sea Combat (HSC) squadrons, and land-based fixed-wing maritime patrol and reconnaissance (VP) and fleet air reconnaissance (VQ). These pilots and NFOs were then trained to operate the P-3 Orion, the EP-3E Aries II, the E-6 Mercury, or variants of the MH-60 Seahawk. Those in the VP community would also eventually qualify to fly the P-8 Poseidon once that aircraft began replacing the P-3 in 2012. The Navy re-evaluated the program in 2011, when the last of the "flying" chief warrant officers reported to their operational fleet squadrons and opted to subsequently terminate the program. Enlisted sailors in the grades E-5 through E-7 who had at least an associate degree and were not currently serving in the diver, master-at-arms, nuclear, SEAL, SWCC, or EOD communities were eligible to apply.

Reestablishment of warrant officer one 

On 4 June 2018, the Chief of Naval Operations announced the reestablishment of the rank of warrant officer one (pay grade W-1), for cyber warrant officers, and solicited applications for the rank/grade. These warrant officers will receive their appointment via warrant and not via commission. They will incur a six-year service obligation once promoted to W-1. A minimum of three-years in grade with a total service time of 12 years must be achieved before appointment and commission to chief warrant officer (W-2). However, the President also may grant appointments of warrant officers in the grade of W-1 via commission at any time, and the Secretary of the Navy may also appoint warrant officers in that grade via commission, through additional regulations. In mid-December 2018, the Navy announced that six selectees had been named. They will wear a distinctive cap badge with two crossed anchors.

Air Force 
The United States Air Force no longer uses the warrant officer grade. The USAF inherited warrant officer ranks from the Army at its inception in 1947, but their place in the Air Force structure was never made clear. This was not publicly acknowledged until years later. The Air Force stopped appointing warrant officers in 1959.

The last active-duty Air Force chief warrant officer, CWO4 James H. Long, retired in 1980. The last Air Force Reserve chief warrant officer, CWO4 Bob Barrow, retired in 1992. Upon his retirement, Barrow was honorarily promoted to CWO5, the only person in the Air Force ever to hold this grade.

Coast Guard 
Due to the small size and decentralized organizational structure of the Coast Guard, warrant officers often fill command roles. Warrant officers frequently serve as officers-in-charge of Coast Guard Stations and patrol boats but also fill a variety of billets as specialists and supervisors in other technical areas, and serve as special agents in the Coast Guard Investigative Service. They wear insignia essentially like that of their Navy counterparts, but with the USCG shield between the rank insignia and the specialty mark, as Coast Guard commissioned officers do with their rank insignia. Like their Navy counterparts, candidates for the rank of chief warrant officer must typically be serving in the chief petty officer grades (E-7 through E-9), however, the Coast Guard also permits selection of first class petty officers (E-6) who are chief petty officer selectees and who are in the top 50% on their advancement list to E-7. The Coast Guard does not use the rank of warrant officer (WO-1). Although authorized in 1994, the Coast Guard has not promoted any of its warrant officers to CWO5.

Public Health Service Commissioned Corps 

United States Maritime Service 
The U.S. Maritime Service (USMS), established at 46 U.S. Code § 51701, falls under the authority of the Maritime Administration of the U.S. Department of Transportation and is authorized to appoint warrant officers, although none have been so appointed. In accordance with the law, the USMS rank structure must be the same as that of the U.S. Coast Guard, while uniforms worn are those of the U.S. Navy, with distinctive USMS insignia and devices.

Notable warrant officers 

 CWO2/Chief Carpenter John Arnold Austin, USN
 FO Gene Autry, USAAF (Equivalent of WO1). (Flew C-109 in C-B-I, TV and Radio star)
 WO1 Floyd Bennett, USN (Medal of Honor)
 FO Jackie Coogan, USAAF (Equivalent of WO1) (Distinguished Flying Cross) (Glider Pilot in C-B-I, TV and Movie Star)
 CW5 David F. Cooper, USA (Distinguished Service Cross)
 CW4 Michael Durant, USA (Black Hawk Down)
 MAJ (was CW3) Frederick Edgar Ferguson, USA (Medal of Honor)
 CWO4 John W. Frederick, Jr., USMC (Navy Cross)
 James W. Hall, III, USA (convicted of espionage and stripped of rank)
 CW4 Thomas J. Hennen, USA (Astronaut)
 WO1 Olive Hoskins USA (the first female warrant officer)
 CW4 Oscar G. Johnson, USA (Medal of Honor)
 WO1 John W. Lang, USN (Navy Cross)
 WO1 Robert Mason, USA (best-selling author)
 CW2 Jason W. Myers, USA (Distinguished Service Cross)
 CW4 Michael J. Novosel, USA (Medal of Honor)
 CW5 Ralph E. Rigby, USA (last continuously serving draftee on active duty in the U.S. Army, retired in 2014)
 CW2 Louis R. Rocco, USA (Medal of Honor)
 Captain (was WO Machinist) Donald K. Ross, USN, awarded the first Medal of Honor of World War II
 MAJ (was WO1) Hugh Thompson, Jr., USA (Soldier's Medal recipient)
 CW3 Brad R. Torgersen, USAR, multi-award-winning science fiction author
 WO1 Gore Vidal USA
 John Anthony Walker, Jr., USN (convicted of espionage and stripped of rank)
 CWO4 Henry Wildfang, USMC (Gray Eagle Award recipient for longest-serving naval aviator; only chief warrant officer in the history of U.S. Naval Aviation so honored)
 CWO4 Hershel W. Williams, USMC (Medal of Honor)
 Brig Gen Chuck Yeager, USAF (World War II USAAF flight officer, equivalent to WO-1)
 CW4 Keith Yoakum, USA (Distinguished Service Cross)
 CW3 Ronald D. Young Jr., USA (POW, game show contestant)

See also 
 Aviation Cadet Training Program (USAAF)
 List of comparative military ranks
 Ranks and insignia of NATO armies officers
 List of United States Navy ratings
 List of United States Coast Guard ratings
 Army Staff Senior Warrant Officer

Notes

References

Further reading 
 United States Congressional Budget Office study: "The Warrant Officer Ranks: Adding Flexibility to Military Personnel Management" 
 direct link to the PDF

External links 
 DoD Almanac. The United States Military Officer Rank Insignia. United States Department of Defense.
 US Army Institute of Heraldry Warrant Officer Insignia History
 United States Warrant Officer Association (USAWOA)
 United States Coast Guard Chief Warrant and Warrant Officers Association (CWOA)
 U.S. Navy Flying Chief Warrant Officers (unofficial)
 U.S. Navy Flying Chief Warrant Officers (official)
 Navy Pay Clerks
 theNavyCWO.com

Military ranks of the United States Army
Military ranks of the United States Marine Corps
Military ranks of the United States Navy
Military ranks of the United States Air Force
Military ranks of the United States Coast Guard
Warrant officers
Military ranks of the United States

it:Warrant officer